Jawahar Navodaya Vidyalaya, Bagudi, Balasore, Odisha  (JNV Bagudi or JNV Balasore) is an Indian public residential school in Bagudi village (near Mangalpur) of Soro block in the Balasore district, Odisha.

Government-run, it provides education to children predominantly from the rural areas and economically challenged families.

It was established and is managed by Navodaya Vidyalaya Samiti (an autonomous organization of the Ministry of Human Resource Development and Department of Secondary Education and Higher Education). In accordance with the National Policy on Education (1986) of the government of India, the Jawahar Navodaya Vidyalaya Bagudi in the Balasore district was established during March 1987.

History
Established in 1987, the school is the brain child of the then-human resources minister P. V. Narasimha Rao (who later became Prime Minister of India) and Prime Minister Rajiv Gandhi to find and foster talented children from the rural parts of India.

They were formerly named as Navodaya Vidyalayas and renamed later as Jawahar Navodaya Vidyalayas in the birth-centenary year of Jawaharlal Nehru, the first prime minister of independent India. Navodaya Vidyalayas are all over the country, except Tamil Nadu. There are approximately 557 JNVs across India, offering free education to all students who are selected through the admission process which includes an all-India entrance exam, held at the district level.

A fee of Rs.200 per month is charged for general category boys who are above the poverty line.

Silver jubilee

The school celebrated its silver jubilee with alumni from all over India and guests including:
 Srikant Kumar Jena, minister, Ministry of Statistics and Programme Implementation, government of India
 Kumarbar Das, vice chancellor, Fakir Mohan University, Balasore, Odisha
 Srei T. C. S. Naidu, joint commissioner, Jawahar Navodaya Vidyalaya, New Delhi
 Dr. B. K. Das Scientist G, additional director, ITR, Defence Research and Development Organisation, Chandipur, Odisha

Logo and motto

Its motto is Pragyanam Brhamam; the symbol consists of students assisted by a teacher, holding a book and computer.

Reputation
The school offers a field of academic, cultural, sports and many others activities, including NCC and Scouts. Its alumni have advanced to research institutes, including the National Institute of Science Education and Research, the Indian Space Research Organisation, the Defence Research and Development Organisation, as well as to Indian engineering colleges, including the Indian Institute of Science, the Indian Institutes of Technology , the National Institutes of Technology and Institute of Technical Education and Research.

See also

 List of schools in Odisha

References

External links
 , the school's official website

1987 establishments in Orissa
Boarding schools in Odisha
Education in Balasore district
Educational institutions established in 1987
Jawahar Navodaya Vidyalayas in Odisha
Public schools
High schools and secondary schools in Odisha